The 1974 Super Outbreak was the second-largest tornado outbreak on record for a single 24-hour period, just behind the 2011 Super Outbreak. It was also the most violent tornado outbreak ever recorded, with 30 F4/F5 tornadoes confirmed. From April 3–4, 1974, there were 148 tornadoes confirmed in 13 U.S. states and the Canadian province of Ontario. In the United States, tornadoes struck Illinois, Indiana, Michigan, Ohio, Kentucky, Tennessee, Alabama, Mississippi, Georgia, North Carolina, Virginia, West Virginia, and New York. The outbreak caused roughly $843 million USD (~equivalent to $4.58 billion in 2019) in damage, with more than $600 million (~equivalent to $3.3 billion in 2019) occurring in the United States. At one point, as many as 15 separate tornadoes were occurring simultaneously.

The 1974 Super Outbreak was the first tornado outbreak in recorded history to produce more than 100 tornadoes in under a 24-hour period, a feat that was not repeated globally until the 1981 United Kingdom tornado outbreak and in the United States until the 2011 Super Outbreak.

Meteorological synopsis

A powerful springtime low pressure system developed across the North American Interior Plains on April 1. While moving into the Mississippi and Ohio Valley areas, a surge of unusually moist air intensified the storm further, while there were sharp temperature contrasts between both sides of the system. Officials at NOAA and in the National Weather Service forecast offices were expecting a severe weather outbreak on April 3, but not to the extent that ultimately occurred. Several F2 and F3 tornadoes had struck portions of the Ohio Valley and the South in a separate, earlier outbreak on April 1 and 2, which included three killer tornadoes in Kentucky, Alabama, and Tennessee. The town of Campbellsburg, northeast of Louisville, was hard-hit in this earlier outbreak, with a large portion of the town destroyed by an F3. Between the two outbreaks, an additional tornado was reported in Indiana in the early morning hours of April 3, several hours before the official start of the outbreak. On Wednesday, April 3, severe weather watches already were issued from the morning from south of the Great Lakes, while in portions of the Upper Midwest, snow was reported, with heavy rain falling across central Michigan and much of Ontario.

By 12:00 UTC on April 3, a large-scale trough extended over most of the contiguous United States, with several modest shortwaves rotating around the broad base of the trough. Due to significant moisture advection, destabilization rapidly proceeded apace; the warm front near the Gulf Coast dissipated and then redeveloped northward over the Ohio River valley. Consequently, CAPE levels in the region rose to 1,000 J/kg. However, a warm temperature plume in the elevated mixed layer kept thunderstorms from initiating at the surface. Meanwhile, a large mesoscale convective system (MCS) that had developed overnight in Arkansas continued to strengthen due to strong environmental lapse rates. Later in the day, strong daytime heating caused instability to further rise. By 18:00 UTC, CAPE values in excess of 2,500 J/kg were present over the lower Ohio and the Mississippi Valley. As wind speeds in the troposphere increased, Large-scale lifting overspread the warm sector. At the same time, the forward-propagating MCS spread into the Tennessee and Ohio valleys, where it evolved into the first of three main convection bands that produced tornadoes. However, thunderstorm activity, for the moment, remained mostly elevated in nature.

By 16:30 UTC, the large MCS began to splinter into two sections: the southern part slowed, lagging into southeast Tennessee, while the northern part accelerated, reaching Pennsylvania by 19:30 UTC. The split was related to several factors, including a band of subsidence over eastern Kentucky and western West Virginia; local downslope winds over the Appalachians; and an inversion over the same area. These factors allowed the northern part of the MCS to accelerate due to efficient ducting, while the southern part slowed as the boundary layer warmed and moistened. Numerous surface-based supercells began to develop in the southern area, beginning with one that produced an F3 tornado at about 16:30 UTC near Cleveland, Tennessee. Meanwhile, a new band of scattered thunderstorms developed at 15:00 UTC over eastern Arkansas and Missouri; over the next four hours, this band became the focus for several intense supercells, starting in eastern Illinois and southern Indiana. In the wake of the MCS, backing low-level winds, rapid diurnal destabilization, and perhaps cool, mid-level advection had occurred over the warm sector, weakening the convective inhibition (CINH) layer, and favorable wind profiles bolstered helicity to over 230 m2/s²—a combination of factors conducive to tornadogenesis. Consequently, the storms increased in intensity and coverage as they moved into Illinois, Indiana, and northern Kentucky, producing several tornadoes, including the first F5 tornado of the day, at 19:20 UTC, near Depauw, Indiana. Several of the storms to form between 19:20 and 20:20 UTC became significant, long-lived supercells, producing many strong or violent tornadoes, including three F5s at Depauw; Xenia, Ohio; and Brandenburg, Kentucky. These storms formed the second of three convective bands to generate tornadoes.

While violent tornado activity increased over the warm sector, a third band of convection developed at about 16:00 UTC and extended from near St. Louis into west-central Illinois. Storms grew rapidly in height and extent, producing baseball-sized hail by 17:20 UTC in Illinois and, shortly thereafter, in St. Louis, Missouri, which reported a very severe thunderstorm early in the afternoon that, while not producing a tornado, was the costliest storm to hit the city up to that time. By 19:50 UTC, supercells producing F3 tornadoes hit the Decatur and Normal areas in Illinois. As thunderstorms moved into the warmer, moister air mass over eastern Illinois and Indiana, they produced longer-lived tornadoes—one of which began near Otterbein and ended near Valentine in Indiana, a distance of 121 miles (194 km). 

Meanwhile, by 00:00 UTC the southern half of the first convective band became indistinguishable from new convection that had formed farther south over Alabama and Tennessee in connection with convective band two. In this area, increasing west-southwesterly wind shear at all levels of the troposphere, juxtaposed over near-parallel outflow boundaries, allowed successive supercells, all producing strong, long-tracked tornadoes, to develop unconstrained by their outflow in a broad region from eastern Mississippi, to the southern Tennessee. These storms, forming after 23:00 UTC, produced some of the most powerful tornadoes of the outbreak, including a large and long-tracked F4 that struck the western and central portions of Alabama, tracking for just over 110 miles (178 km), two F5s that both slammed into Tanner, causing extensive fatalities, an extremely potent F5 that devastated Guin in Alabama, and multiple violent, deadly tornadoes that affected and caused fatalities in Tennessee.

Michigan was not hit as hard as neighboring states or Windsor, with only one deadly tornado that hit near Coldwater and Hillsdale, killing people in mobile homes; however, thunderstorm downpours caused flash floods, and north of the warm front in the Upper Peninsula, heavy snowfall was reported. Activity in the south moved towards the Appalachians during the overnight hours and produced the final tornadoes across the southeast during the morning of April 4. A series of studies by Dr. Tetsuya T. Fujita in 1974–75—which were later cited in a 2004 survey by Risk Management Solutions—found that three-quarters of all tornadoes in the 1974 Super Outbreak were produced by 30 'families' of tornadoes—multiple tornadoes spawned in succession by a single thunderstorm cell. The majority of these were long-lived and long-tracked individual supercells.

Confirmed tornadoes

Note: An F3 tornado was confirmed in Ontario.
Never before had so many violent (F4 and F5) tornadoes been observed in a single tornado outbreak. There were seven F5 tornadoes and 23 F4 tornadoes. The outbreak began in Morris, Illinois, at around 1:00 pm on April 3. As the storm system moved east where daytime heating had made the air more unstable, the tornadoes grew more intense. A total of 19 people were killed in this tornado. The first F5 tornado of the day struck the city of Depauw, Indiana, at 3:20 pm EDT. It killed 6 and injured 86 others along its 65-mile path, leveling and sweeping away homes in Depauw and Daisy Hill.

Seven F5 tornadoes were observed—one each in Indiana, Ohio and Kentucky, three in Alabama and the final one which crossed through parts of Indiana, Ohio and Kentucky. 31 were killed in Brandenburg, Kentucky, and 28 died in Guin, Alabama. An F3 tornado also occurred in Windsor, Ontario, Canada, killing nine and injuring 30 others there, all of them at the former Windsor Curling Club. During the peak of the outbreak, a staggering 16 tornadoes were on the ground simultaneously. At one point forecasters in Indiana, frustrated because they could not keep up with all of the simultaneous tornado activity, put the entire state of Indiana under a blanket tornado warning. This was the first and only time in U.S. history that an entire state was under a tornado warning.

There were 18 hours of nearly continuous tornado activity that ended in Caldwell County, North Carolina, at about 7:00 am on April 4. A total of 319 were killed in 148 tornadoes from April 3 through April 4 and 5,484 were injured.

The 1974 Super Outbreak occurred at the end of a very strong, nearly record-setting La Niña event. The 1973–74 La Niña was just as strong as the 1998–99 La Niña. Despite the apparent connection between La Niña and two of the largest tornado outbreaks in United States history, no definitive linkage exists between La Niña and this outbreak or tornado activity in general. Some tornado myths were soundly debunked (not necessarily for the first time) by tornado activity during the outbreak.

Depauw/Daisy Hill, Indiana

Of the F5 tornadoes produced by the outbreak, the DePauw tornado was the first to form, touching down at 3:20 pm local time. It is probably the least-known of the F5 tornadoes in the outbreak as it traveled through rural areas in southern Indiana northwest of Louisville, traversing about  through parts of Perry and Harrison Counties. F5 damage was observed near the community of Depauw, where numerous farms were leveled. Areas near Palmyra and Borden were also heavily affected by the tornado. Morgan Elementary School in northern Harrison County Indiana was directly hit by the tornado. Four classrooms were destroyed and the roof was removed from the school and placed on the cars of the faculty. Fortunately, the children and faculty, who were huddled in the hallways, were not injured. All but 10 homes in  Martinsburg were destroyed; and in the Daisy Hill community homes were completely swept away at F5 intensity. Published photographs of this storm reveal a very wide debris cloud and wall cloud structure, with no visible condensation funnel at times. Overall, six were killed by the storm and 86 were injured. One of the fatalities occurred when a woman was crushed by a school bus that flew into a ditch she was sheltering in.

Xenia, Ohio

The tornado that struck the city of Xenia, Ohio stands as the deadliest individual tornado of the 1974 Super Outbreak, killing 32 people and destroying a significant portion of the town. The tornado formed near Bellbrook, Ohio, southwest of Xenia, at about 4:30 pm EDT. It began as a moderate-sized tornado, then intensified while moving northeast at about 50 mph (80 km/h). The tornado exhibited a multiple-vortex structure and became very large as it approached town. The massive tornado slammed into the western part of Xenia, completely flattening the Windsor Park and Arrowhead subdivisions at F5 intensity, and sweeping away entire rows of brick homes with little debris left behind in some areas. Extensive wind-rowing of debris occurred in nearby fields.

When the storm reached central Xenia at 4:40 pm, apartment buildings, homes, businesses, churches, and schools including Xenia High School were destroyed. Students in the school, practicing for a play, took cover in the main hallway seconds before the tornado dropped a school bus onto the stage where they had been practicing and extensively damaged the school building. Several railroad cars were lifted and blown over as the tornado passed over a moving Penn Central freight train in the center of town. It toppled headstones in Cherry Grove Cemetery, then moved through the length of the downtown business district, passing west of the courthouse (which sustained some exterior damage). Numerous businesses in downtown Xenia were heavily damaged or destroyed, and several people were killed at the A&W Root Beer stand as the building was flattened. Upon exiting Xenia, the tornado passed through Wilberforce, heavily damaging several campus and residential buildings of Wilberforce University. Central State University also sustained considerable damage, and a water tower there was toppled.

A total of 32 people lost their lives in the tornado, and about 1,150 were injured in Xenia, several of whom took proper shelter. In addition to the direct fatalities, two Ohio Air National Guardsmen deployed for disaster assistance were killed on April 17 when a fire swept through their temporary barracks in a furniture store. The memorial in downtown Xenia lists 34 deaths, in honor of the two Guardsmen. About 1,400 buildings (roughly half of the town) were heavily damaged or destroyed. Damage was estimated at US$100 million ($471.7 million in 2013 dollars).

Dr. Ted Fujita and a team of colleagues undertook a 10-month study of the 1974 Super Outbreak. Fujita initially assigned the Xenia tornado a preliminary rating of F6 intensity ± 1 scale, before deeming F6 ratings "inconceivable".

Hanover/Madison, Indiana

Soon after the Depauw tornado lifted, the Hanover/Madison F4 tornado formed near Henryville and traveled through Jefferson County and leveled many structures in the small towns of Hanover and Madison. A total of 11 people were killed in this storm while an additional 300 were injured. According to a WHAS-TV Louisville reporter in a special report about the outbreak, 90% of Hanover was destroyed or severely damaged, including the Hanover College campus.  Despite the fact that no one was killed or seriously injured at the college, 32 of the college's 33 buildings were damaged, including two that were completely destroyed and six that sustained major structural damage. Hundreds of trees were down, completely blocking every campus road. All utilities were knocked out and communication with those off campus was nearly impossible. Damage to the campus alone was estimated at about US$10 million. In Madison alone, where seven of the fatalities took place, about 300 homes were destroyed. The tornado also brushed the community of China causing additional fatalities.

The same storm would later strike the Cincinnati area, producing multiple tornadoes, including another F5 tornado.

Brandenburg, Kentucky

The Brandenburg tornado, which produced F5 damage and took 31 lives, touched down in Breckinridge County around 3:25 pm CDT and followed a  path. The tornado first moved across the north edge of Hardinsburg, inflicting F3 damage to homes at that location. The tornado quickly became violent as it moved into Meade County, producing F4 damage as it passed north of Irvington, sweeping away numerous homes in this rural area. Vehicles were thrown hundreds of yards from residences and mangled, and a few were completely wrapped around trees. One home that was swept away sustained total collapse of a poured concrete walk-out basement wall. A news photographer reported that the tornado "left no grass" as it crossed KY 79 in this area, and canceled checks from near Irvington were later found in Ohio. Past Irvington, the tornado tore directly through Brandenburg at F5 intensity, completely leveling and sweeping away numerous homes, some of which were well-built and anchor-bolted. The town's downtown area was also devastated with 18 of the fatalities occurring along Green Street alone. Trees and shrubbery in town were debarked and stripped, extensive wind-rowing of debris occurred, and numerous vehicles were destroyed as well, some of which had nothing left but the frame and tires. A curtain rod was found speared deeply into the trunk of one tree in town. Several tombstones in the Cap Anderson cemetery were toppled and broken, and some were displaced a small distance. Exiting Brandenburg, the tornado crossed into Indiana producing F4 damage there before dissipating. The same storm would later produce tornadoes in the Louisville metro area.

When the tornado struck on April 3, 1974, many of the Brandenburg residents at that time had also experienced a major flood of the Ohio River that affected the area in 1937 as well as numerous other communities along the river, including Louisville and Paducah. The Brandenburg tornado is the only tornado to produce F5/EF5 damage in the state of Kentucky.

Cincinnati/Sayler Park, Ohio

The Sayler Park tornado was among a series of tornadoes that earlier struck portions of southern Indiana from north of Brandenburg, Kentucky, into southwest Ohio. This tornado was witnessed on television by thousands of people, as WCPO aired the tornado live during special news coverage of the tornadoes. It was also noted for the rarity in that its path was in parts of three states. It began shortly before 4:30 pm CDT or 5:30 pm EDT in southeastern Indiana in Ohio County north of Rising Sun near the Ohio River. It then traveled through Boone County, Kentucky, producing F4 damage in the Taylorsport area before crossing the Ohio River a second time into Ohio. Here, the tornado reached F5 intensity as it slammed into Sayler Park. The first area of town hit was the Morehead Marina, where numerous boats were thrown and destroyed. A large floating restaurant barge at this location was lifted, ripped from its moorings, and flipped by the tornado. It was later recovered several miles downstream. A nearby house was lifted from its foundation and thrown into the river. At a further inland area of Sayler Park, the tornado maintained F5 intensity as numerous homes were swept away at a hilly area near a lake, with only bare slabs remaining. NWS surveyors noted that a pickup truck in this area was carried a half block over the roofs of five homes before being smashed to the ground. The tornado weakened somewhat as it continued northeastward, passing through multiple Cincinnati neighborhoods and destroying numerous homes. Some of the worst affected areas were Bridgetown, Mack, Dent and Delhi. Damage in Delhi was rated as high as F4. The tornado took three lives and injured 210 with 190 of the injuries were in Hamilton County, Ohio alone. It was considered the most-photographed tornado of the outbreak.

This tornado dissipated west of White Oak, but the same thunderstorm activity was responsible for two other tornado touchdowns in the Lebanon and Mason areas. The Mason tornado, which started in the northern Cincinnati subdivisions of Arlington Heights and Elmwood Place, was rated F4 and took two lives, while the Warren County tornado was rated an F2 and injured 10.

Louisville, Kentucky

About an hour after the Brandenburg tornado, the same supercell spawned an F4 tornado that formed in the southwest part of Jefferson County near Kosmosdale. Another funnel cloud formed over Standiford Field Airport, touched down at The Kentucky Fair and Exposition Center, and destroyed the majority of the horse barns at the center and part of Freedom Hall (a multipurpose arena) before it crossed I-65, scattering several vehicles on that busy expressway. The tornado continued its  journey northeast where it demolished most of Audubon Elementary School and affected the neighborhoods of Audubon, Cherokee Triangle, Cherokee-Seneca, Crescent Hill, Indian Hills, Northfield, Rolling Fields, and Tyler Park. Numerous homes were destroyed in residential areas, including a few that were leveled. The tornado ended near the junction of Interstates 264 and 71 after killing three people, injuring 207 people, destroying over 900 homes, and damaging thousands of others. Cherokee Park, a historic  municipal park located at Eastern Parkway and Cherokee Road, had thousands of mature trees destroyed. A massive re-planting effort was undertaken by the community in the aftermath of the tornado.

Dick Gilbert, a helicopter traffic reporter for radio station WHAS-AM, followed the tornado through portions of its track including when it heavily damaged the Louisville Water Company's Crescent Hill pumping station, and gave vivid descriptions of the damage as seen from the air.  A WHAS-TV cameraman also filmed the tornado when it passed just east of the Central Business District of Louisville.

WHAS-AM broke away from its regular programming shortly before the tornado struck Louisville and was on-air live with John Burke, the chief meteorologist at the National Weather Service's Louisville office at Standiford Field when the tornado first descended.  The station remained on the air delivering weather bulletins and storm-related information until well into the early morning hours of April 4.  As electrical power had been knocked out to a substantial portion of the city, the radio station became a clearinghouse for vital information and contact with emergency workers, not only in Louisville but across the state of Kentucky due to its 50,000-watt clear-channel signal and the fact that storms had knocked numerous broadcasting stations in smaller communities, such as Frankfort, off the air.  Then-Governor Wendell Ford commended the station's personnel for their service to the community in the time of crisis, and Dick Gilbert later received a special commendation from then-President Richard Nixon for his tracking of the tornado from his helicopter.

Monticello, Indiana

This half-mile (0.8 km) wide F4 tornado developed (as part of a tornado family that moved from Illinois to Michigan for 260 miles) during the late afternoon hours. This tornado produced the longest damage path recorded during the 1974 Super Outbreak, on a southwest to northeast path that nearly crossed the entire state of Indiana. It also struck portions of six other counties, with the hardest hit being White County and its town of Monticello. Much of the town was destroyed including the courthouse, some churches and cemeteries, 40 businesses and numerous homes as well as three schools. It also heavily damaged the Penn Central bridge over the Tippecanoe River. Overall damage according to the NOAA was estimated at about US$250 million with US$100 million damage in Monticello alone.

After the tornado struck Monticello, the tornado reached peak strength and completely leveled several farms northwest of town. The tornado then went on to tear through the west side of Rochester, where businesses were destroyed and homes were completely leveled and swept away. Riddle Elementary School was badly damaged as well. The tornado then struck Talma, destroying most of the town, including a fastening plant and the schoolhouse. The tornado continued northeast and struck the south sides of Atwood and Leesburg, with additional severe damage occurring at both locations. The tornado then crossed Dewart Lake and Lake Wawasee, destroying multiple lakeside homes and trailers. The Wawasee Airport was hard hit, where hangars were destroyed and planes were thrown and demolished. The tornado destroyed several buildings as it passed between Ligonier and Topeka, including Perry School and a Monsanto plant. Train cars near the plant blown off the tracks and thrown into the building. The tornado then finally dissipated near Oliver Lake airfield.

A total of 18 people were killed during the storm including five people from Fort Wayne when their mini-bus fell 50 feet (15 m) into the Tippecanoe River near Monticello. One passenger did survive the fall. Five others were killed in White County, six in Fulton County and one in Kosciusko County.  The National Guard had assisted the residents in the relief and cleanup efforts and then-Governor Otis Bowen visited the area days after the storm. One of the few consolations from the tornado was that a century-old bronze bell that belonged to the White County Courthouse and served as timekeeper was found intact despite being thrown a great distance. The tornado itself had contradicted a long-time myth that a tornado would "not follow terrain into steep valleys"  as while hitting Monticello, it descended a 60-foot (18 m) hill near the Tippecanoe River and heavily damaged several homes immediately afterwards.

Tanner, Alabama (1st tornado)

As the cluster of thunderstorms was crossing much of the Ohio Valley and northern Indiana, additional strong storms developed much further south just east of the Mississippi River into the Tennessee Valley and Mississippi. It produced the first deadly tornadoes in Alabama during the early evening hours. Most of the small town of Tanner, west of Huntsville in Limestone County, was destroyed when two F5 tornadoes struck the community 30 minutes apart. 

The first tornado formed at 6:30 pm CDT in Lawrence County, Alabama and ended just over 90 minutes later in Madison County, Alabama, killing 28 people. The tornado first touched down near the small community of Mt. Hope, and then tracked into Mt. Moriah, where the tornado rapidly intensified and swept away homes and hurled fleeing vehicles, and where a family of six were killed. Further along the track, many homes were swept away near Moulton. A water pump was completely lifted out of a wellhouse along SR 157 in this area. In one case, the destruction was so complete that a witness reported that the largest recognizable objects among scattered debris from an obliterated house were some bed-springs. The tornado crossed into Morgan County, causing additional destruction in rural areas near Hillsboro and Trinity. Crossing the Tennessee River into Limestone County as a large waterspout, the tornado flattened a ¾-mile–wide swath of trees on the opposite bank. Ground scouring occurred in this area, as reddish soil was dug up and plastered against trees. The storm then slammed into Tanner, where many homes were swept away, vehicles were tossed, shrubbery was debarked, and Lawson's Trailer Park sustained major damage. The tornado then continued into Madison County and struck the Capshaw and Harvest areas. Numerous homes in Harvest and surrounding rural areas of the county were swept completely away and scattered, and extensive wind-rowing of debris was noted. A bathtub from one residence was found deeply embedded into the ground. Past Harvest, the tornado abruptly dissipated northeast of town, having a peak width of 500 yards.

Jasper/Cullman, Alabama

While tornadoes were causing devastation in the northwesternmost corner of the state, another supercell crossing the Mississippi-Alabama state line produced another violent tornado that touched down in Pickens County before heading northeast for nearly 2 hours towards the Jasper area causing major damage to its downtown as the F4 storm struck. Damage was reported in Cullman from the storm before it lifted.

The Jasper tornado first touched near Aliceville, producing scattered damage as it tracked northeastward. The damage became more intense continuous as the tornado entered Tuscaloosa County. The tornado continued to strengthen south of Berry, and two people were killed near the Walker County line when a church was destroyed. The tornado tore directly through downtown Jasper at 6:57 PM, resulting in severe damage and at least 100 injuries. Numerous buildings and storefronts were heavily damaged in downtown Jasper, and many streets were blocked with trees and power lines. The Walker County courthouse sustained major damage, and a new fire station was completely leveled. The fireman on duty at the time took shelter underneath a nearby bridge, and survived without injury. The Walker County Library and the Jasper First Methodist Church were also damaged. The tornado crossed Lewis Smith Lake and moved across the south side of Cullman at 7:40 pm. Multiple homes and shopping centers were damaged or destroyed in the area, resulting in one death and 36 injuries. The tornado finally dissipated northeast of Cullman a short time later.

In total, the storm took three lives, but injured one hundred and fifty residents of Jasper or Cullman. Five hundred buildings were destroyed, with nearly four hundred other buildings severely damaged. At the same time, a third supercell was crossing the state line near the track of the previous two.

Tanner, Alabama (2nd tornado)

While rescue efforts were underway to look for people under the destroyed structures, few were aware that another violent tornado would strike the area. The path of the second tornado, which formed at 7:35 pm CDT was 83 miles in length, also had a peak width of 500 yards, and the storm formed along the north bank Tennessee River less than a mile from the path of the earlier storm; with much of its path very closely paralleling its predecessor as it tore through Limestone and Madison Counties. 16 people were killed by this second tornado. Tanner was the first community to be hit, and many structures that were left standing after the first tornado were destroyed in the second one. A man injured at Lawson's Trailer Park in the first tornado was taken to a church in the area, which collapsed in the second tornado, killing him.

After devastating what was left of Tanner, the tornado continued across rural Limestone County and into Madison County, where the communities of Capshaw and Harvest were devastated once again. Numerous homes throughout Madison County were swept completely away, with extensive wind-rowing of debris noted once again. Past Harvest, the tornado swept away multiple additional homes in the Hazel Green area. The tornado continued northeastward through rural portions of Madison County before crossing into Tennessee, where major damage and 6 deaths occurred in Franklin and Lincoln Counties before the tornado dissipated in Coffee County. Two of the fatalities in Tennessee occurred when a church was destroyed during service. The death toll from the two tornadoes was over 45 and over 400 were injured. Most of the fatalities occurred in and around the Tanner area. Over 1,000 houses, 200 mobile homes and numerous other outbuildings, automobiles, power lines and trees were completely demolished or heavily damaged. The most recent official National Weather Service records show that both of the Tanner tornadoes were rated F5. However, the rating of the second Tanner tornado is still disputed by some scientists; analysis in one publication estimates F3-F4 damage along the entirety of the second storm's path. This was the second state to have been hit by more than two F5 tornadoes during the 1974 Super Outbreak. The next occurrence of two F5 tornadoes hitting the same state on the same day happened in March 1990 in Kansas, and then in both Mississippi and Alabama on April 27, 2011. Meanwhile, the next F5 tornado to hit the state was on April 4, 1977 near Birmingham. Tanner was hit by yet another EF5 tornado during the 2011 Super Outbreak.

Guin, Alabama

The fast-moving nighttime tornado that devastated the town of Guin, was the longest-duration F5 tornado recorded in the outbreak, and considered to be one of the most violent ever recorded. It formed at around 8:50 pm CDT near the Mississippi-Alabama border, north of the town of Vernon, striking the Monterey Trailer Park, resulting in major damage at that location. The tornado  then became extremely violent as it approached and entered Guin, with multiple areas of F5 damage noted in and around town. The tornado first struck the Guin Mobile Home Plant as it entered the town, completely obliterating the structure. Nothing was left of the plant but a pile of mangled steel beams, and its foundation was partially pushed clean of debris. The town's downtown area was also heavily damaged, with many brick businesses and two churches completely destroyed. Trees in town were debarked, ground scouring occurred, and vehicles were thrown and mangled as well. Residential areas in Guin suffered total devastation, with many homes swept completely away and scattered across fields. According to NWS damage surveyor Bill Herman, the damage in one 6-block area was particularly extreme, and remarked that "It was just like the ground had been swept clean. It was just as much of a total wipeout as you can have." Surveyor J.B. Elliot noted that the destruction was so complete, that even some of the foundations were "dislodged, and in some cases swept away." A total of 23 people were killed in Guin.

The tornado continued past Guin and struck the small community of Twin, destroying numerous homes, mobile homes, and businesses at that location, though the damage was less intense than that observed in Guin. Crossing into Winston County, the tornado struck the small community of Delmar, destroying additional homes and killing 5 people. Mobile homes in Delmar were obliterated, with their frames wrapped around trees. Past Delmar, the tornado grew up to a mile wide as it tore through the William B. Bankhead National Forest, flattening a huge swath of trees. Surveyors noted that timber damage was equally severe at all elevations in this area, with numerous trees snapped both along exposed ridges and in deep gorges. So many trees were snapped in this area that the tornado path was visible from satellite. The tornado finally dissipated south of Basham, destroying 546 structures, killing 28 people, and injuring 332 others. The same supercell then re-strengthened and produced a new tornado just south of the town of Decatur. However, the  section of the original path, from Decatur to Hytop, was determined later to be from the F3 tornado listed below.

Huntsville, Alabama

Huntsville was affected shortly before 11:00 pm EDT by a strong F3 tornado produced by the same thunderstorm that produced the Guin tornado. This tornado produced heavy damage in the south end of the city, eventually damaging or destroying nearly 1,000 structures.

The tornado touched down north of Hartselle and moved northeast toward Huntsville. It first hit the Redstone Arsenal, damaging or destroying numerous buildings at that location. But thanks to early warning from an MP picket line on Rideout Road (now Research Park Boulevard (SR 255)), there were only three, relatively minor, injuries. One of the buildings destroyed was a publications center for the Nuclear Weapons Training School on the Arsenal. For months afterwards, portions of classified documents were being returned by farmers in Tennessee and Alabama. Many homes were badly damaged or destroyed as the tornado passed through residential areas of the city, and a school was destroyed as well. Many businesses were also heavily damaged, and numerous trees and power lines were downed throughout the city. The Glenn'll trailer park was completely destroyed by the tornado, and some sources list a fatality occurring at that location. The tornado then reached Monte Sano Mountain, which has an elevation of 1,640 feet (492 m), where additional homes were torn apart. The National Weather Service office at Huntsville Jetplex was briefly "closed and abandoned" due to the severe weather conditions. The tornado eventually dissipated near Jacobs Mountain. Remarkable electrical phenomenon was reported as the tornado passed through Huntsville, with reports of luminous clouds, ball lightning, and multi-colored flashes and glowing areas in the sky as the storm moved through the city. These aforementioned flashes were more than likely Power Flashes, which are flashes of light caused by arcing electrical discharges from damaged electrical equipment, most often severed power lines.

See also
List of tornadoes and tornado outbreaks
List of North American tornadoes and tornado outbreaks
List of Canadian tornadoes and tornado outbreaks
List of tornadoes striking downtown areas of large cities
List of F5 and EF5 tornadoes
Tornado outbreak of December 10–11, 2021 - One of the deadliest tornado outbreaks in Kentucky's history.
2011 Super Outbreak – A very similar, but larger and deadlier outbreak that occurred in April 2011.

Notes

References

Further reading
 Tornado! the 1974 super outbreak, by Jacqueline A. Ball; consultant, Daniel H. Franck. New York: Bearport Pub., 2005. 32 pages.  (lib. bdg),  (paperback).
 Tornado at Xenia, April 3, 1974, by Barbara Lynn Riedel; photography by Peter Wayne Kyryl. Cleveland, OH, 1974. 95 pages. No ISBN is available. Library of Congress Control Number: 75314665.
 Tornado, by Polk Laffoon IV. New York: Harper & Row, 1975. 244 pages. .
 Tornado alley: monster storms of the Great Plains, by Howard B. Bluestein. New York: Oxford University Press, 1999. 180 pages.  (acid-free paper).
 Delivery of mental health services in disasters: the Xenia tornado and some implications, by Verta A. Taylor, with G. Alexander Ross and E. L. Quarantelli. Columbus, OH: Disaster Research Center, Ohio State University, 1976. 328 pages. There is no ISBN available.  Library of Congress Control Number: 76380740.
 The widespread tornado outbreak of April 3–4, 1974: a report to the Administrator. Rockville, Md: U.S. Dept. of Commerce, National Oceanic and Atmospheric Administration, 1974. 42 pages. There is no ISBN available.  Library of Congress Control Number: 75601597.
 The tornado, by John Edward Weems. Garden City, NY: Doubleday, 1977. 180 pages. .

External links

 Natural Disaster Survey Report: The Widespread Tornado Outbreak of April 3-4, 1974 (National Oceanic and Atmospheric Administration)
 Full map of The Super Outbreak   Tornado History Project
 "WHAS Radio Covers the April 3, 1974 Tornado Disaster," excellent-quality recorded coverage of the tornado at LKYRadio.com
 1974 Windsor Tornado – CBC Archives
 April 3, 1974 Superoutbreak (NWS Indianapolis, IN)
 The Monticello Tornado (NWS Northern Indiana)
 April 3, 1974 Super Outbreak (NWS Nashville, TN)
 The April 3rd and 4th 1974 Tornado Outbreak in Alabama (NWS Birmingham, AL)
 The Super Outbreak: Outbreak of the Century (Slide show) (NOAA-NWS-NCEP Storm Prediction Center)
 The 3–4 April 1974 Super Outbreak: Outbreak of the Century (Slide show – Revised) (NOAA-NWS-NCEP Storm Prediction Center)
 The Super Outbreak: Outbreak of the Century (22nd Conference on Severe Local Storms, American Meteorological Society)
 Revisiting the 3–4 April 1974 Super Outbreak of Tornadoes (Weather and Forecasting, American Meteorological Society)
 Potential insurance losses from a major tornado outbreak: the 1974 Super Outbreak example (22nd Conference on Severe Local Storms, American Meteorological Society)
 A website dedicated to the Super Outbreak
 The Weather Channel's Storm of the Century list – #2 The Super Outbreak
 Super Outbreak 30th Anniversary Special (WHAS Louisville)
 WHAS April 3, 1974 Live Breaking News Coverage part 1
 WHAS April 3, 1974 Live Breaking News Coverage part 2
 1974 Alabama tornado table including tornadoes from the Super Outbreak – Courtesy of NWS Birmingham, Alabama
 
 Footage is included in Encounters with Disaster (1979), directed by Charles E. Sellier, Jr.

F5 tornadoes
Tornado outbreaks
Tornadoes of 1974
Tornadoes in Ontario
Tornadoes in Alabama
Tornadoes in Georgia (U.S. state)
Tornadoes in Kentucky
Tornadoes in Illinois
Tornadoes in Indiana
Tornadoes in Michigan
Tornadoes in Mississippi
Tornadoes in New York (state)
Tornadoes in North Carolina
Tornadoes in Ohio
Tornadoes in Tennessee
Tornadoes in Virginia
Tornadoes in West Virginia
Essex County, Ontario
History of Cincinnati
History of Louisville, Kentucky
History of Windsor, Ontario
1974 in Canada
1974 in Michigan
1974 natural disasters in the United States
April 1974 events in North America
1974-04-04